Phlugiolopsis is a genus of Asian bush crickets belonging to the tribe Meconematini in the subfamily Meconematinae. They are found in Indochina, China and Sumatra.

Species 
The Orthoptera Species File lists the following species, that may be placed in four subgenera:
subgenus Longiloba Bian, Shi & Chang, 2018
Distribution: China
 Phlugiolopsis bispinata Bian & Shi, 2018
 Phlugiolopsis complanispinis Bian, Shi & Chang, 2013
 Phlugiolopsis emarginata Bian, Shi & Chang, 2013
 Phlugiolopsis montana Wang, Li & Liu, 2012
 Phlugiolopsis pentagonis Bian, Shi & Chang, 2013
subgenus Omkoiana Sänger & Helfert, 2002
Distribution: China, Indochina, Sumatra
 Phlugiolopsis aculeata (Sänger & Helfert, 2002)
 Phlugiolopsis bilobulata Gorochov, 2020
 Phlugiolopsis brevis Xia & Liu, 1993
 Phlugiolopsis chayuensis Wang, Li & Liu, 2012
 Phlugiolopsis damingshanis Bian, Shi & Chang, 2012
 Phlugiolopsis digitusis Bian, Shi & Chang, 2012
 Phlugiolopsis huangi Bian, Shi & Chang, 2012
 Phlugiolopsis longiangulis Bian, Shi & Chang, 2013
 Phlugiolopsis longicerca Wang, Li & Liu, 2012
 Phlugiolopsis minuta (Tinkham, 1943)
 Phlugiolopsis pectinis Bian, Shi & Chang, 2012
 Phlugiolopsis trilobulata Gorochov, 2020
 Phlugiolopsis trullis Bian, Shi & Chang, 2012
 Phlugiolopsis tuberculata Xia & Liu, 1993
 Phlugiolopsis uncicercis Bian, Shi & Chang, 2013
 Phlugiolopsis ventralis Wang, Li & Liu, 2012
 Phlugiolopsis vietnamica Wang, Li & Liu, 2012
 Phlugiolopsis xinanensis Bian, Shi & Chang, 2013
subgenus Phlugiolopsis Zeuner, 1940
Distribution: China, Taiwan
 Phlugiolopsis carinata Wang, Li & Liu, 2012
 Phlugiolopsis grahami (Tinkham, 1944)
 Phlugiolopsis henryi Zeuner, 1940 - type species
 Phlugiolopsis taiwanensis Wang, Chen & Shi, 2019
 Phlugiolopsis yaeyamensis Yamasaki, 1986
subgenus Tribranchis Bian & Shi, 2018
Distribution: China
 Phlugiolopsis circolobosis Bian, Shi & Chang, 2013
 Phlugiolopsis elongata Bian, Shi & Chang, 2013
 Phlugiolopsis punctata Wang, Li & Liu, 2012
 Phlugiolopsis tribranchis Bian, Shi & Chang, 2012
subgenus Uncinata Bian & Shi, 2018
Distribution: China, Vietnam
 Phlugiolopsis adentis Bian, Shi & Chang, 2012
 Phlugiolopsis angustimarginis Bian & Shi, 2018
 Phlugiolopsis latusiprocera Bian & Shi, 2018
 Phlugiolopsis mistshenkoi (Gorochov, 1993)
 Phlugiolopsis platylobosis Bian & Shi, 2018
 Phlugiolopsis yunnanensis Shi & Ou, 2005

References

External links

Tettigoniidae genera
Meconematinae
Orthoptera of Asia